Vušković or Vuskovic is a South Slavic surname. Notable people with the surname include:

Danijel Vušković (born 1981), Croatian footballer
Kristina Vušković (born 1967), Serbian graph theorist
Mario Vušković (born 2001), Croatian footballer
Miloš Vušković (1900–1975), Montenegrin painter
Pedro Vuskovic (1924–1993), Chilean economist and politician
Sergio Vuskovic (born 1930), Chilean politician

See also
Vuskovic plan, Chilean economic policy

Croatian surnames